William "Bill" Griffin (birth year unknown) is a Welsh former rugby union, and professional rugby league footballer who played in the 1950s.

Rugby union
Griffin started his career in rugby union, where he played for Abertillery. In his final season at the club, he was the club's leading goal- and try-scorer.

Rugby league
In June 1951, Griffin switched to rugby league and joined Huddersfield. He made his début in August 1951 against Halifax. He spent his entire rugby league career with the club, announcing his retirement during the 1956–57 season.

International honours
In rugby league, Griffin won one cap for Wales while at Huddersfield in 1952 against France.

County Cup Final appearances
Bill Griffin played right-, i.e. number 10, in Huddersfield's 18-8 victory over Batley in the 1952 Yorkshire County Cup Final during the 1952–53 season at Headingley Rugby Stadium, Leeds on Saturday 15 November 1952.

References

Living people
Abertillery RFC players
Huddersfield Giants players
Place of birth missing (living people)
Rugby league locks
Rugby league players from Abertillery
Rugby union players from Abertillery
Wales national rugby league team players
Welsh rugby league players
Welsh rugby union players
Year of birth missing (living people)